The Pan-American Team Handball Federation (PATHF) has been the continental governing body for handball, beach handball, wheelchair handball and snow handball in Americas since 23 May 1977. PATHF includes North America, Central America, South America and the Caribbean. PATHF's primary functions is to organize competitions for national teams and clubs, and to conduct Men's World Handball Championship and Women's World Handball Championship qualifying tournaments.

On 14 January 2018, during the IHF Council meeting, PATHF was suspended by International Handball Federation and was divided into two continental confederations namely the North America and the Caribbean Handball Confederation and the South and Central America Handball Confederation. The IHF Council decision was taken on the facts that there are no signs of development in the level of handball and beach handball in the North American, Central American and the Caribbean countries. There was some development in South American level but that was also not comparable to the other continents like Europe, Asia and Africa. No team from Americas had ever reached to the semifinal stage of the IHF World Men's Handball Championship and the IHF Men's Junior World Championship till date. The PATHF appealed to the Court of Arbitration for Sport, and it annulled IHF's decision. At the Extraordinary IHF Congress 2019 the IHF statues were revised to add the new federations.

History
PATHF was founded on 23 May 1977, which made it one of the five continental confederations affiliated with International Handball Federation. Argentina, Chile, Canada, Mexico and the United States of America were founding members.
The first executive committee was composed of President Dr. Peter Buehning (USA), Vice-President Mr. Juan Mainzhausen (Argentina), Secretary General Mr. Walter Schwedhelm (Mexico), and Treasurer Mr. Francis Geulen (Canada).
Current PATHF President is Mr. Mario Moccia from Argentina.

PATHF Presidents

 Mario Moccia resigned on 11 June 2019, Júlio Noveri took over as Interim President. 
 PATHF was succeeded by NACHC and SCAHC as per the decision of Extraordinary IHF Congress held at Gothenburg (Sweden) on 3 July 2019.

PATHF Council
The PATHF Council was an institution of the Pan-American Team Handball Federation. It was the main decision-making body of the organization in the intervals of PATHF Congress. It also had a subsidiary i.e. PATHF Executive Committee, which takes decisions during the intervals of Council Meetings. PATHF Executive Committee was formed of the President, 1st Vice-President, 2nd Vice-President, Secretary General and Treasurer. Following was the last PATHF Council elected for the years 2016 – 2020 before PATHF's dissolution on 14 January 2018 by the International Handball Federation.

PATHF Commissions

Affiliated members

North America and the Caribbean

  Barbados
  Canada
  Cuba
  Dominican Republic
  Greenland
  Haiti
  Mexico
  Puerto Rico
  Trinidad and Tobago
  United States of America

Central America

  Costa Rica
  El Salvador
  Guatemala
  Honduras
  Nicaragua
  Panama

South America

  Argentina
  Bolivia
  Brazil
  Chile
  Colombia
  Ecuador
  Paraguay
  Peru
  Uruguay
  Venezuela

Non-Members
Following is the list of national handball federations who are affiliated to the International Handball Federation but are not granted affiliation by the PATHF.

  Antigua and Barbuda
  Bahamas
  British Virgin Islands
  Cayman Islands
  Dominica
  Grenada
  Saint Kitts and Nevis
  Saint Lucia
  Belize
  Guyana

Regional Member

  French Guiana (France)
  Guadeloupe (France)
  Martinique (France)

Tournaments

PATHF
 Pan American Men's Handball Championship
 Pan American Women's Handball Championship
 Pan American Men's Junior Handball Championship
 Pan American Women's Junior Handball Championship
 Pan American Men's Youth Handball Championship
 Pan American Women's Youth Handball Championship
 Pan American Men's Cadet Handball Championship
 Pan American Women's Cadet Handball Championship
 Pan American Games

Club
 Pan American Men's Club Handball Championship
 Pan American Women's Club Handball Championship
 South American Men's Club Handball Championship (defunct)
 South American Women's Club Handball Championship (defunct)

Beach
 Pan American Beach Handball Championship
 Pan American Youth Beach Handball Championship
 Bolivarian Beach Games
 South American Beach Games

South America
 South American Handball Championship
 South American Junior Handball Championship
 South American Youth Handball Championship
 South American Cadet Handball Championship
 South American U14 Handball Championship
 South American Games
 Bolivarian Games

Central America
 Central American Handball Championship
 Central American Games
 Central American and Caribbean Games

North America and Caribbean
 Caribbean Handball Championship
 Nor.Ca. Handball Championship

Current champions

(Titles)
(*) Record titles

Sponsors
 Qatar Airways

References

External links
 PATHF official website

 
National members of the International Handball Federation
+Pan-America